Nicholas of Transylvania may refer to:

Voivodes sometimes so named: 
 Nicholas I of Transylvania, (ruled 1201 and possibly into 1202)
 Nicholas II of Transylvania, (ruled 1213)
 Miklós Sirokay, a.k.a. Nicholas, (ruled 1342–1344) 
 Nicholas Kont, (ruled 1351–1356)
 Nicholas of Ilok a.k.a. Nicholas Újlaki, (ruled jointly 1441–1458 and 1462–1465, lived 1410–1477)